The 1987–88 season was the 89th completed season of The Football League.

Final league tables and results 

The tables and results below are reproduced here in the exact form that they can be found at The Rec.Sport.Soccer Statistics Foundation website, with home and away statistics separated.

First Division

Liverpool won the league title by nine points, and with only two defeats all season. Second in the league were Manchester United.

The automatically relegated sides were Watford, Oxford United and Portsmouth. Chelsea were subsequently relegated as well after losing to Middlesbrough in the playoff final.

Final table

First Division results

Managerial changes

First Division maps

Second Division

Millwall lifted the Second Division championship trophy and gained promotion to the First Division for the first time in their history. Runners-up were Aston Villa, and Middlesbrough won promotion via play-offs.

Huddersfield Town and Sheffield United were relegated.

Second Division play-offs 

The team fourth from bottom of the First Division played off for one place in that division with the teams finishing third, fourth and fifth in the Second Division. In the semi-final, Chelsea of the First Division beat fifth-placed Blackburn Rovers 6–1 on aggregate, and third-placed Middlesbrough beat Bradford City 3–2 on aggregate. The final was also played over two legs. Playing at their Ayresome Park ground in front of a crowd of 25,531, Middlesbrough duly won the first leg 2–0 with goals from Bernie Slaven and Trevor Senior. In the second leg at Stamford Bridge, which was marred by violence perpetrated by some of the 40,550 spectators, Chelsea's Gordon Durie scored the only goal. Thus Middlesbrough won 2–1 on aggregate and were promoted to the First Division for 1988–89, while Chelsea were relegated to the Second.

Source:

Second Division results

Third Division

Sunderland won the Third Division and went back up to the Second Division. They were joined by runners-up Brighton & Hove Albion and playoff winners Walsall. The automatic relegation places were occupied by Grimsby Town, York City and Doncaster Rovers, with Rotherham United relegated after play-offs.

Third Division play-offs 

Replay

Third Division results

Fourth Division

Wolves ended their two-year tenure in the Fourth Division by finishing top of the table and winning promotion to the Third Division. They also won the Sherpa Van Trophy final by defeating Burnley at Wembley.

Bolton Wanderers, Cardiff City and Swansea City were also promoted.

Newport County were relegated for the second successive season. They were replaced in the Football League by Lincoln City.

Fourth Division play-offs

Fourth Division results

Goalscorers
The top goalscorers in each division were:
 Division 1 - John Aldridge (26)
 Division 2 - David Currie (28)
 Division 3 - David Crown (26)
 Division 4 - Steve Bull (34)

See also
 1987–88 in English football

References

 
English Football League seasons